Georgios Amerikanos (alternate spelling: Giorgos) (Greek: Γιώργος Αμερικάνος; 21 December 1942 – 7 October 2013) was a Greek professional basketball player and basketball coach. He was nicknamed Global, or Worldwide. In honour of his great contributions to the club as a player, his number 10 jersey was retired by AEK Athens.

Club career
Amerikanos started playing basketball with the youth clubs of XAN Nikaias (YMCA). He then moved to the Greek club AEK Athens, where he would become one of the best players in the history of the club. With AEK, he won 6 Greek League championships (1963, 1964, 1965, 1966, 1968, and 1970).

He also led the team to the final four of the FIBA European Champions Cup of the 1965–66 season, which was the first time that the EuroLeague ever used a final four system, thus leading a Greek team to a final four in the EuroLeague for the first time ever. He also led AEK to the championship of the 2nd-tier level Cup Winners' Cup of the 1967–68 season, which was the first European championship won by any Greek team. He scored 29 points in the tournament's final game.

He was also the Greek League Top Scorer twice during his career, in 1965 and 1968. He also played with Apollon Patras.

National team career
Amerikanos was also a member of the senior men's Greek national basketball team. In 68 caps played with Greece's senior men's team, he scored 1,076 points, for an average of 15.8 points per game. He played at the FIBA EuroBasket 1961 and the FIBA EuroBasket 1965, being Greece's leading scorer in both tournaments, with scoring averages of 15.5 points and 17.4 points per game.

He also played at the 1967 Mediterranean Games, five Balkan Championships (1962, 1963, 1964, 1967, 1969), and the 1960 Pre-Olympic Tournament.

Coaching career
Amerikanos has also coached Ergotelis, Apollon Patras, AEK Athens, and Aigaleo. He led AEK to the final of the Greek Cup in 1978.

References

External links
FIBA Profile
FIBA Europe Profile
Hellenic Basketball Federation Profile 

1942 births
2013 deaths
AEK B.C. coaches
AEK B.C. players
Aigaleo B.C. coaches
Apollon Patras B.C. coaches
Apollon Patras B.C. players
Ergotelis B.C. coaches
Greek basketball coaches
Greek men's basketball players
Shooting guards
Small forwards
Basketball players from Piraeus